Jack Draper was the defending champion but lost in the first round to Borna Gojo.

Pavel Kotov won the title after defeating Quentin Halys 7–5, 6–7(5–7), 6–3 in the final.

Seeds

Draw

Finals

Top half

Bottom half

References

External links
Main draw
Qualifying draw

Città di Forlì III - 1